Doubt, A Parable is a 2004 play by John Patrick Shanley. Originally staged off-Broadway at the Manhattan Theatre Club on November 23, 2004, the production transferred to the Walter Kerr Theatre on Broadway in March 2005 and closed on July 2, 2006 after 525 performances and 25 previews. The play won the 2005 Pulitzer Prize for Drama and Tony Award for Best Play. 

In 2008, the play was adapted as a feature film entitled Doubt. It starred Meryl Streep as Sister Aloysius and Philip Seymour Hoffman as Father Flynn and was nominated for several Academy Awards.

Plot
The play is set in the fictional St. Nicholas Church School, in the Bronx, during the fall of 1964. It opens with a sermon by Father Flynn, a beloved and progressive parish priest, addressing the importance of uncertainty: "Doubt can be a bond as powerful and sustaining as certainty." The school's principal, Sister Aloysius, a rigidly conservative nun who is vowed to her order, the Sisters of Charity, insists upon constant vigilance. During a meeting with a younger nun, Sister James, Aloysius reveals a deep mistrust toward her students, her fellow teachers, and society in general. Naïve and impressionable, James is easily upset by Aloysius’s severe manner and harsh criticism.

Aloysius and Flynn are put into direct conflict when she learns from James that the priest had a one-to-one meeting with Donald Muller, St. Nicholas’s first African-American student. Mysterious circumstances lead her to believe that sexual misconduct occurred. In a private meeting, purportedly regarding the Christmas pageant, Aloysius, in the presence of  James, openly confronts Flynn with her suspicions. He angrily denies wrongdoing by insisting that he was disciplining Donald for drinking altar wine and claims to have been protecting the boy from harsher punishment. James is relieved by the explanation. Flynn's next sermon is on the evils of gossip.

Aloysius, dissatisfied with Flynn's story, meets with Donald's mother, Mrs. Muller. Despite Aloysius's attempts to shock her, Mrs. Muller says she supports her son's relationship with Flynn. She ignores Aloysius's accusations. Before departing, she hints that Donald may be "that way," which may cause her husband to be beating him. 

Flynn eventually threatens to remove Aloysius from her position if she does not back down. Aloysius informs him that she phoned the last parish to which he was assigned and that she discovered a history of past infringements. After declaring his innocence, the priest begins to plead with her, but she blackmails him and demands for him resign immediately, or she will publicly disgrace him with his history. Disgusted, she leaves the office. Flynn calls the bishop to apply for a transfer and later receives a promotion as pastor of a nearby parochial school. 

After hearing the news, Aloysius reveals to Sister James that the decisive phone call to Flynn's previous parish was a fabrication and that she has no evidence of past wrongdoing. As a result, Aloysius is left with ambiguous doubt, and the audience is left to wonder if the doubt is in either herself or the Church. With no proof on Father Flynns guilt or innocence, the audience is left with its own doubt.

Characters
Sister Aloysius Beauvier: The head nun and principal of St Nicholas School. Driven by a high sense of duty but rigid and conservative.
Father Brendan Flynn: A middle-aged priest. Articulate and personable.
Sister James: A young impressionable nun. Enthusiastic but inexperienced teacher.
Mrs. Muller: The mother of Donald Muller, the school's first black student.

Productions

The New York City production, directed by Doug Hughes, was performed in a one-act performance running approximately ninety minutes. In interviews, the cast said the second act took place when the audience left the theatre and began to discuss their differing opinions of the events, with some people agreeing with Aloysius and others siding with Flynn. Upon publication, Shanley changed the title from Doubt to Doubt: A Parable. The four original cast members were Cherry Jones as Sister Aloysius, Brían F. O'Byrne as Father Flynn, Heather Goldenhersh as Sister James, and Adriane Lenox as Mrs. Muller. This production had scenic design by John Lee Beatty, costume design by Catherine Zuber, lighting design by Pat Collins, and original music and sound design by David Van Tieghem.

In 2006, Eileen Atkins, Ron Eldard, and Jena Malone joined the cast and replaced Jones, O'Byrne, and Goldenhersh, respectively. In the fall of 2006, Jones headed the national touring company, consisting of Chris McGarry, Lisa Joyce, and Caroline Stefanie Clay. Doubt won the 2007 Touring Broadway Award as Best Play.

The West Coast premiere was directed by Claudia Weill and took place at the Pasadena Playhouse. Another production was staged at Rubicon Theatre Company in Ventura, California in 2010. It was directed by Artistic Associate Jenny Sullivan and starred Joseph Fuqua as Father Flynn and Robin Pearson Rose as Sister Aloysius.

In 2007, the play was staged in Venezuela, in the Cellarg Theatre, with Elba Escobar, Luigi Sciamanna, Mariaca Semprun and Beatriz Vazquez.
 
The Australian premiere was mounted at the Sydney Opera House by the Sydney Theatre Company on February 4, 2006. The cast included Alison Bell, Jennifer Flowers, and Christopher Garbardi, and was directed by Julian Meyrick. This was followed by the Asian debut of Doubt in Singapore on March 21, 2006, by ACTION Theatre, directed by Samantha Scott-Blackhall, with Nora Samosir as Sister Aloysius, Lim Yu-Beng as Father Flynn and Pam Oei as Sister James.  The next production was in the Philippines on June 2, 2006. Doubt ran at the Auckland Theater Company in New Zealand, from March 16 to April 8, 2006, directed by Colin McColl, with Latham Gaines as Father Flynn, Elizabeth Hawthorne as Sister Aloysius, Kate Prior as Sister James and Goretti Chadwick as Mrs Muller.

In the Czech Republic, the play was premiered in 2007 by  National Theatre in Prague with Jaromíra Mílová, Jan Novotný, Magdaléna Borová and Eva Salzmannová. In 2012 it was staged by a Czech non-professional theater group with Andrea Jeřábková, Libor Ulovec, Lucie Koderová and Martha Coutin Caicedo in the roles. The latter was awarded the Best Czech Non-Professional Drama Performance 2012.

The play was staged in the Philippines in 2006 by Atlantis Productions. This production starred Cherie Gil as Sister Aloysius and played at the Carlos P. Romulo Theater at the RCBC Plaza in June 2006.

The play premiered in Britain at the Tricycle Theatre. Directed by Nicolas Kent, it starred Dearbhla Molloy as Sister Aloysius, Nikki Amuka-Bird as Mrs Muller, Padraic Delaney as Father Flynn and Marcella Plunkett as Sister James. The production ran from November 22, 2007, to January 12, 2008.

The play was directed by Roman Polanski during its run at the Théâtre Hébertot in Paris in late 2006. In April 2007, it was staged in Warsaw, Poland, by producer Gene Gutowski, at Polonia Theatre.

A production directed by Mel Hooley with Zimbabwean actors Kevin Hanssen and Anne Fischer was staged at Dorchester Arts in Dorset from August 19–21, 2010, supported by the British Council.

A production opened in Sydney, Australia, at the Old Fitzroy Theatre on May 12, 2017. The cast, Belinda Giblin (Sister Aloysius), Matilda Ridgway (Sister James), Damian de Montemas (Father Flynn) and Charmaine Bingwa (Mrs Muller), was directed by Dino Dimitriadis.

Awards and nominations

Adaptations
A 2008 film adaptation by Miramax stars Meryl Streep as Sister Aloysius, Philip Seymour Hoffman as Father Flynn, Amy Adams as Sister James and Viola Davis as Mrs. Miller (the name was changed in the film). Production began on December 1, 2007, with playwright John Patrick Shanley directing and Scott Rudin producing. 

An opera based on the play, commissioned by the Minnesota Opera, premiered in 2013, with music by Douglas J. Cuomo to a libretto by Shanley.

References

Bibliography

External links
 
 

2004 in Christianity
2004 plays
American plays adapted into films
Broadway plays
Catholicism in fiction
Drama Desk Award-winning plays
New York Drama Critics' Circle Award winners
Nuns in fiction
Off-Broadway plays
Plays adapted into operas
Plays by John Patrick Shanley
Plays set in New York City
Plays set in the 1960s
Pulitzer Prize for Drama-winning works
Tony Award-winning plays